John Smith (February 17, 1826  December 31, 1907) was a Union Navy sailor in the American Civil War and a recipient of the U.S. military's highest decoration, the Medal of Honor, for his actions at the Battle of Mobile Bay.

Born in Albany, New York, Smith joined the Navy in September 1851. On that day, during the Battle of Mobile Bay, Alabama, he continued to man his gun despite heavy fire. For this action, he was awarded the Medal of Honor four months later, on December 31, 1864. He was discharged in February 1882, and lived at the Philadelphia Naval Asylum until his death.

Smith's official Medal of Honor citation reads:
As captain of a gun on board the U.S.S. Richmond during action against rebel forts and gunboats and with the ram Tennessee in Mobile Bay, 5 August 1864. Despite damage to his ship and the loss of several men on board as enemy fire raked her decks, Smith fought his gun with skill and courage throughout a furious 2-hour battle which resulted in the surrender of the rebel ram Tennessee and in the damaging and destruction of batteries at Fort Morgan.

References 

1826 births
1907 deaths
Military personnel from Albany, New York
Burials at Mount Moriah Cemetery (Philadelphia)
People of New York (state) in the American Civil War
Union Navy sailors
United States Navy Medal of Honor recipients
American Civil War recipients of the Medal of Honor